Mihaela Cristina Popescu Faurei (born December 20, 1979) is a former Canadian professional tennis player.

Born in Bucharest, Romania, Popescu left her native country with her family in 1989. She was ranked amongst the world's top 10 in junior tennis and was an Australian Open girls' singles semi-finalist. In 1996 she made WTA Tour main draw appearance at the Canadian Open and Canadian Indoor tournaments. She played collegiate tennis for the UCLA Bruins and suffered a series of injuries during this time that caused her to retire from tennis.

ITF finals

Singles: 1 (0–1)

References

External links
 
 

1979 births
Living people
Canadian female tennis players
UCLA Bruins women's tennis players
Romanian emigrants to Canada
Tennis players from Bucharest